Dove Dale, also known as the Archibald Dove House, Daniel Dove House, and Grover Bryant House, is a historic plantation house near Darlington, Darlington County, South Carolina.  The original section dates to about 1805, with later 19th- and early 20th-century alterations. It is a 1½-story frame double-pile, spraddle-roofed house. The house features a front porch with six wood piers. A contributing small fish pond is an early landscape feature of the front lawn. Surrounding the house are agricultural fields that have continued under cultivation for over 200 years.

It was listed on the National Register of Historic Places in 2007.

References

Anti-black racism in the United States
Plantation houses in South Carolina
Houses on the National Register of Historic Places in South Carolina
Greek Revival houses in South Carolina
Houses completed in 1805
Houses in Darlington County, South Carolina
National Register of Historic Places in Darlington County, South Carolina
Darlington, South Carolina
1805 establishments in South Carolina